Bram Stoker's Burial of the Rats is a 1995 American film. It was part of a series Roger Corman Presents.

A comic book version of the story was released.

Plot
Bram Stoker is kidnapped by some mysterious women.

Cast
 Adrienne Barbeau as The Queen
 Maria Ford as Madeleine
 Kevin Alber as Bram Stoker
 Olga Kabo as Anna
 Eduard Plaxin as Mr. Stoker
 Vladimir Kuleshov as Constable
 Leonid Timtsunik as Verlaine
 Maya Menglet as Mme. Renaud

Production
Filming took place in Moscow. Adrienne Barbeau later said "we landed on the night of the attempted coup and they declared martial law...and I wasn't sure I was ever going to see my family again. I really took the job because they were filming in Moscow and I wanted to go there. I had never been and I'd always wanted to go."

She later recalled, "I was also supposed to be working with 50 trained rats, but there were only 16 and I think eight of them were dead. The rest had only been trained to eat anything that smelled like fish. So every time I'd do a scene where the rats had had to swarm all over me, they took fish eggs and squeezed the juice all over my body."

References

External links
 
 
 
 film review at the Spinning Image

1995 films
Films produced by Roger Corman
1995 horror films
American horror television films
Films shot in Moscow
Films based on works by Bram Stoker
Films based on short fiction
1990s English-language films
Films directed by Dan Golden
1990s American films